"Turn That Radio On" is a song written by Paul Davis and Archie Jordan, and recorded by American country music artist Ronnie Milsap.  It was released in December 1991 as the third single from the album Back to the Grindstone.  The song reached #4 on the Billboard Hot Country Singles & Tracks chart, his last Top Ten hit.

Chart performance

Year-end charts

References

1991 singles
Ronnie Milsap songs
Songs written by Paul Davis (singer)
RCA Records singles
Songs written by Archie Jordan
1991 songs
Songs about radio